The Central District of Mahneshan County is in Zanjan province, Iran. At the National Census in 2006, its population was 23,424 in 5,307 households. The following census in 2011 counted 23,022 people in 5,942 households. At the latest census in 2016, the district had 22,261 inhabitants in 6,722 households.

References 

Mahneshan County

Districts of Zanjan Province

Populated places in Zanjan Province

Populated places in Mahneshan County